Józef Różański (born Josef Goldberg; 13 July 1907, in Warsaw – 21 August 1981, in Warsaw) was an officer in the Soviet NKVD Secret Police and later, a Colonel in the Polish Ministry of Public Security (UB), a communist secret police. Born into a Polish-Jewish family in Warsaw, Różański became very active in the Communist Party of Poland before World War II. He joined the NKVD following the Soviet invasion of Poland and after the war, adopting the name Różański, served as an agent with the Polish Communist Security apparatus (Urząd Bezpieczeństwa).

Różański was personally involved in torturing and killing dozens of opponents of the Polish People's Republic (PRL), including anti-communists. and "Cursed soldiers". He gained notoriety as one of the most brutal secret police Officers in Warsaw. Różański personally administered torture to Witold Pilecki, one of the most famous "Cursed soldiers" and the only individual who willingly went to Auschwitz Camp. Pilecki revealed no sensitive information and was executed on May 25, 1948 at Mokotów Prison by Sergeant Piotr Śmietański, the "Butcher".

Józef Różański was arrested in 1953 – at the end of the Stalinist period in Poland – and charged with torturing innocent prisoners, including Polish United Workers' Party members. He was sentenced to 5 years in prison on 23 December 1955. In July 1956, the Supreme Court reopened his case due to improprieties discovered in the original investigation. On 11 November 1957 (charged along with co-defendant Anatol Fejgin), he was again sentenced by the lower court this time to 15 years in prison. He was released in 1964, having served seven years. Różański died of cancer on 21 August 1981, and was buried at the Jewish Cemetery in Warsaw.

Różański was a brother of Jerzy Borejsza.

Notes and references

 Barbara Fijałkowska, Borejsza i Różański. Przyczynek do dziejów stalinizmu w Polsce, Olsztyn 1995. , pp. 260, 203, 210, 216-223.
 AIPN, 0193/7094, Akta osobowe Józefa Różańskiego, k. 5.
 Zdzisław Uniszewski. Józef Różański. "Karta". 31 (2000).
 Stanisław Marat, Józef Snopkiewicz: Ludzie bezpieki: Dokumentacja czasu bezprawia. Warszawa: Alfa, 1990. .
  "Curriculum vitae" written by Józef Różański himself on 7 September 1944, for the Ministry of Public Security of Poland
 Aldona Zaorska, Sąsiedzi. Najbardziej okrutni oprawcy polskich patriotów, Warszawa 2012, .

1907 births
1981 deaths
Military personnel from Warsaw
People from Warsaw Governorate
20th-century Polish Jews
Polish communists
Jewish socialists
NKVD officers
Polish United Workers' Party members
Prisoners and detainees of Poland
Polish prisoners and detainees
Polish intelligence officers (1943–1990)